Hibbertia lividula is a species of flowering plant in the family Dilleniaceae and is endemic to the south-west of Western Australia. It is an erect or sprawling shrub with thin branchlets, bluish-grey, narrow elliptic to narrow oblong leaves and yellow flowers, with thirty to forty stamens arranged around the five glabrous carpels.

Description
There are thirty to forty stamens arranged around the five glabrous carpels that each contain two or three ovules. Flowering occurs from May to September.

Taxonomy
Hibbertia lividula was first formally described in 1994 Judith R. Wheeler in the journal Nuytsia from specimens she collected near Beacon in 1989. The specific epithet (lividula) refer to the bluish-grey leaves.

Distribution and habitat
This hibbertia grows in woodland and mallee woodland between Watheroo and Wialki in the Avon Wheatbelt and Geraldton Sandplains biogeographic regions of south-western Western Australia.

Conservation status
Hibbertia lividula is classified as "not threatened" by the Western Australian Government Department of Parks and Wildlife.

See also
List of Hibbertia species

References

lividula
Flora of Western Australia
Plants described in 1994